A shared church, simultaneum mixtum, a term first coined in 16th-century Germany, is a church in which public worship is conducted by adherents of two or more religious groups.  Such churches became common in the German-speaking lands of Europe in the wake of the Protestant Reformation.  The different Christian denominations (such as Roman Catholic, Lutheran, Reformed, or United, etc.), share the same church building, although they worship at different times and with different clergy.  It is thus a form of religious toleration.

Simultaneum as a policy was particularly attractive to rulers who ruled over populations which contained considerable numbers of both Catholics and Protestants.  It was often the opposite of cuius regio, eius religio and used in situations where a ruler was of a different religion than the majority of the people, and not strong enough to impose his religion on the population.

During the Nine Years' War (1688–1697), Louis XIV of France occupied the Electorate of the Palatinate, a Protestant region situated mainly in the western part of what is today Germany, where he introduced the simultaneum.  At the end of the war the region returned to Protestant control, but a last-minute addition to the Treaty of Ryswick provided for a continuation of the simultaneum.  Although intended to apply only to the Palatinate, the simultaneum was subsequently also applied in portions of Protestant Alsace (a region ruled by France, but where the Edict of Fontainebleau was not enforced).

Examples

Belgium
 Olne, province of Liège; a simultaneum was introduced in 1649

France
 Béarn - there used to be a simultaneum there between 1561–1569
 Old Saint Peter's Church, Strasbourg, Alsace; now divided into separate Protestant and Catholic churches
 Wissembourg, Alsace: there was a so-called trimultaneum, with a Catholic, Lutheran, and Reformed congregation sharing one church

Germany
 Altenberg im Bergischen Land, Altenberger Dom, since 1857 Catholic-United simultaneum
 Althaldensleben, Double Church, Catholic-United simultaneum until the present day
 Bautzen, St. Peter's Cathedral, oldest Catholic-Lutheran simultaneum since 1524
 Bechtolsheim, Ss. Mary and Christopher, Catholic-United simultaneum until the present day
 Berlin, French Church of Friedrichstadt, Calvinist-United simultaneum since 1981
 St. Martin's Church, Biberach, Catholic-Lutheran simultaneum until the present day
 Biebelsheim, St. Martin's Church, Catholic-United simultaneum until the present day
 Boos upon Nahe, Simultaneum, Catholic-United simultaneum until the present day
 Brauneberg, St. Remigius Church, Catholic-United simultaneum until the present day
 Braunfels, Castle Church, since 2005 a Catholic-United simultaneum
 Wildenreuth, St. James' Church, Catholic-Lutheran simultaneum until the present day
 Fröndenberg, Collegiate Church, Catholic-United simultaneum until the present day
 Gau-Odernheim, St. Rufus Church, Catholic-United simultaneum until the present day
 Goldenstedt, in Vechta, Lower Saxony was a simultaneum between 1650 and 1850.
 Groß Ammensleben, former Cloister Church, from 1614 until 1817 a Catholic-Lutheran simultaneum, since then a Catholic-United simultaneum
 Hahn im Hunsrück, Catholic-United simultaneum until the present day
 Hildesheim, St. Michael's Church, since 1542 a Catholic-Lutheran simultaneum
 Frankenhof, St. Margareth Church, Catholic-Lutheran simultaneum until the present day
 Götzendorf in Bavaria, St. Magdalena Church, Catholic-Lutheran simultaneum until the present day
 Illschwang, St. Vitus Church, Catholic-Lutheran simultaneum until the present day
 Kulmbach, the castle chapel on the Plassenburg, Catholic-Lutheran simultaneum until the present day
 Mosbach, St. Juliana Collegiate Church, Catholic-United simultaneum until the present day
 Neuried-Schutterzell, St. Michael's Church, a Catholic-United since 1804
 Neustadt an der Weinstraße, Collegiate Church, Catholic-United simultaneum until the present day
 Otterberg, Otterberg Abbey, Catholic-United simultaneum until the present day
 Rheinberg-Ossenberg, Castle Chapel, a Catholic-United simultaneum until the present day
 Ringstedt, St. Fabian Church, since 1706 a Reformed-Lutheran simultaneum
 Rohrdorf in the Black Forest, John's Church, a Catholic-United simultaneum until the present day
 Saarbrücken, Church of Peace, an Old Catholic-Russian Orthodox simultaneum until the present day
 Siebeldingen, St. Quintinus Church, a Catholic-United simultaneum until the present day
 Thuine, St. George's Church, Catholic-Reformed simultaneum until the present day
 Vechta, Cloister Church, since 1818 a Catholic-Lutheran simultaneum
 Wachenheim an der Weinstraße, St. George's Church, Catholic-United simultaneum until the present day
 Wetzlar, former collegiate church, colloquially Wetzlar Cathedral, since 1544–1817 a Catholic-Lutheran, from then on a Catholic-United simultaneum
 Wilnsdorf-Rödgen, St. John the Baptist Church, Catholic-United simultaneum until the present day
 Worms-Pfeddersheim, simultaneum, Catholic-United simultaneum until the present day
 Worms-Rheindürkheim, St. Peter Church, Catholic-United simultaneum until the present day

Poland
 Gniezno, St. Michał Kozal Church, Roman Catholic and Evangelical (of the Augsburg confession) simultaneum (the church with two presbyteries)

United Kingdom
Arundel, St. Nicholas' Church and Fitzalan Chapel. This consists of an Anglican parish church, with a separate Roman Catholic chapel attached, the latter being the burial place of the Dukes of Norfolk. Although these exist within a single building, it is suggested that this should not be properly considered a simultaneum,  as there is no worship space which is shared, but used at different times. The two spaces are separated by an iron grille, and a glass screen, which is kept locked, except during very occasional ecumenical services. The glass screen replaces a brick wall which was erected by a Duke of Norfolk in the 19th century. It was lowered in 1956 and entirely removed in 1970.

Warrington, The Church of the Resurrection and St. Bridget was a shared church building between the Church of England's Church of the Resurrection and the Roman Catholic's St Bridget's RC Church. The building opened in 1988 after originally being planned in 1984 when Bishop David Sheppard, the Anglican Bishop of Liverpool, and Archbishop Derek Worlock, RC Prelate of Liverpool, put forward the proposal. The worship space within the Church was shared by both communities, but Anglican and Catholic services were at different times throughout the week. The Church closed in November 2022 due to falling numbers of parishioners.

United States
Virginia Beach, Church of the Holy Apostles, Roman Catholic and Anglican simultaneum
Pennsylvania; Historically, Lutheran (ELCA) and Reformed (UCC) German immigrants commonly shared churches, particularly in the Pennsylvania Dutch Country region, although some congregations have since built their own separate churches.

Holy Land church-sharing

The main traditional pilgrim churches of Jerusalem and Bethlehem are shared between several denominations. The regulatory work is known as the "Status quo", a type of church-sharing which is in no way related to the West European Protestant-Catholic sharing system described here (the "simultaneum").
 Church of the Holy Sepulchre, Jerusalem - Greek Orthodox-Eastern Orthodox-Oriental Orthodox-Catholic simultaneum until the present day
 Church of the Nativity in Bethlehem

See also
 Ecumenism
 Local ecumenical partnership
 Interfaith worship spaces
 Multifaith space

References
 HighBeam Research, dictionary definition: simultaneum 
 Wiki-Protestants.org, Simultaneum (French language) 
 Musée virtuel du Protestantisme, "Le Simultaneum" (French language): "Le simultaneum résulte de l'histoire alsacienne. Il s'agit d'un édifice cultuel utilisé simultanément par les deux confessions catholique et protestante." 
 [The] Rhein and Laeng of Herrliesheim: Brief History of Alsace-Lorraine 
 Bernhard Brockmann, Simultaneum in Goldenstedt

Notes

External links
Catholic-Protestant community in Germany making “ecumenical congregations” a reality - Novena News

Catholic–Protestant ecumenism
Church architecture
Protestantism in Germany
Christian terminology
Protestantism in France